The Battle of Gnila Lipa took place early in the World War I on 29–30 August 1914, when the Imperial Russian Army invaded Galicia and engaged the defending Austro-Hungarian Army. It was part of a larger series of battles known collectively as the Battle of Galicia. The battle ended in a defeat of the Austro-Hungarian forces.

Background
The battle is named after a river in Western Ukraine, an historical region of Galicia. It is a tributary of Dniester, and is also called the Hnyla Lypa.

According to Prit Buttar, "In Galicia the weakness of the Austro-Hungarian position lay in the east. An entire army - Böhm-Ermolli's Second Army - was still missing, either still deployed in the Balkans or languishing on painfully slow troop trains.  By contrast, the Russians had two powerful armies deployed for an early advance into eastern Galicia.  The two eastern armies were now ordered to move west as fast as possible, in order to reduce the pressure on the Fourth and Fifth Armies.  As his western armies moved north, Conrad had to protect their eastern flank, and therefore ordered Brudermann's Third Army to perform this task by moving north."  The two Russian armies consisted of Nikolai Ruzsky's Third Army, with the IX, X, XI, and XXI Corps, consisting of 12 infantry divisions and 4 cavalry divisions, and the Aleksei Brusilov's Eighth Army, with the VII, VIII, XII, and XXIV Corps, consisting of 10 infantry divisions and 5 cavalry divisions.  The Third Army was located around Rovno and Dubno, while the Eighth Army was located around Proskurov.  The Austro-Hungarian Third Army consisted of the III, XI, and XIV Corps, with 18 infantry divisions and 4 cavalry divisions, supported by Hermann Kövess von Kövessháza's Armeegruppe, consisting of the XII Corps.  Brudermann's Third Army was ordered north to protect Conrad's eastern flank, while Kövess was ordered to advance east of Lemberg towards Przemyślany.  On 21 August, Russian forces crossed the frontier between Brody and Tarnopol.  On 25 August, the Russian Third Army was preparing to advance north of Lemberg, while the Eighth advanced to the south.

Battle
Brudermann's plan of attack was for his XII Corps towards Remizowce, his III Corps towards Zloczow, with the XI protecting the northern flank.  On 26 August, the II Corps advanced and immediately encountered the Russian XI Corps.  By the end of the day, the III Corps advance was limited to Gologory and Zlota Lipa area.  The XII corps encountered the Russian X corps.  On 27 August, Brudermann tried once again to attack east, but that night and the next day, retreated along a line from Lemberg to Przemyslany, and the Gnila Lipa. The 13 Austro-Hungarian divisions now faced 22 Russian divisions, while the Russian VII and XII Corps advanced from the southeast.  Yet the Russian Third Army paused.  On 29 August, attacks by the Austro-Hungarian XII and VII Corps, newly arrived from Serbia, were stopped by the Russian VII and XII Corps respectively.  On 30 August, the Russians pressed forward their attacks, overwhelming the Austro-Hungarian XII Corps, and Brudermann was forced to retreat along a line south from Lemberg.

Aftermath
Prit Buttar noted, "Conrad's spirits lifted when news arrived from Auffenberg's headquarters that the Russian forces involved in the fighting around Komarów had been destroyed, and that it would therefore be possible for the victorious Fourth army to attack towards Lemberg as planned."  However, the Russian Eighth Army advanced through Bukovina, and Brudermann unable to hold his position, withdrew to the Wereszyca.  Lemberg was abandoned on 2 September, and the Russians entered the next day.  Brudermann was dismissed the same day, replaced by Svetozar Boroević.

Additional Reading
 J. Rickard: Battle of Gnila Lipa, 26-30 August 1914.

References

Gnila Lipa, Battle of
Gnila Lipa
Gnila Lipa
Gnila Lipa
Kingdom of Galicia and Lodomeria
1914 in the Russian Empire